Holme is a small rural village  southwest of the town of Holmfirth and  from Tintwistle on the edge of the Pennines in England. Between Holmbridge and Lane Village in West Yorkshire close to the border with Derbyshire. It lies on the boundary of the Peak District National Park, with some properties split to lie partially outside of it.

The Pennine Way passes Southwest of the transmitter over Black Hill. The Peak District Boundary Walk runs through the village.

The water seeping from the surrounding moorland is the source of the River Holme, which passes down through the Holme Valley to Huddersfield, where it flows into the River Colne. It is accessed by the A6024 Woodhead Road.

The village contains a pub, called the Fleece, and a school.

On 6 July 2014, Stage 2 of the 2014 Tour de France from York to Sheffield, passed through the village.

The school
The schoolroom was originally built in 1694 with the interest earned from money bequeathed by Joshua Earnshaw (£300) in 1693 and on land given by James Earnshaw, which is recorded in a document entitled: Township of Holme – Earnshaw's Charity. Having become dilapidated, it was rebuilt in 1820 and again in 1838 when a schoolmaster's house was added at a cost of £680. The schoolroom of this charity was closed in 1880 when education was conducted in other premises of the school board. The only remaining parts of the original building are the sides of the lower storey doorway and its rough-hewn dated headstone. Holme’s new Board School, built on Pinfold Street, now known as Meal Hill Road, had 99 pupils in 1900 falling to only 11 at its lowest point, but the school was allowed to continue and it is flourishing today. The original Holme School building near the centre of the village remains a non-denominational place of worship. 

The schoolmaster was paid from the interest accrued annually on the £300 placed in the charity. The number of children varied from 30 to 40. Until the date of the Elementary Education Act 1891, the school fees of certain children attending the Board School in Holme were paid, but this was discontinued when education was made free, and the school governors then devoted the money to the formation of a school library, with annual payments for books made from the charity.

History
Unlike many British places called Holme, the name of Holme in West Yorkshire derives from Old English holegn ('holly').

In 1822 Thomas Langdale recorded a population of 459 for the township of Holme.

Gallery

See also
 Underhill, Holme

References

External links

Villages in West Yorkshire
Holme Valley
Geography of Holmfirth
Towns and villages of the Peak District